The Home and Away Invitational League was an intercollegiate basketball and volleyball league in the Philippines formed in 2004. It was administered by a group led by Far Eastern University Athletic Heads Anton Montinola and Mark Molina.

The member teams were from different leagues around Metro Manila, namely the Ateneo de Manila University, the De La Salle University-Manila, the University of the East, the University of Santo Tomas, and the Far Eastern University from the University Athletic Association of the Philippines,the De La Salle-College of Saint Benilde, the Emilio Aguinaldo College, the Lyceum of the Philippines University, and the San Beda College from the NCAA.

The first batch of champions in each division were the University of the East for Men's Basketball, the Ateneo de Manila University for Women's Basketball, the Far Eastern University for Men's Volleyball and the Ateneo de Manila University for Women's Volleyball.

Each team was allowed to have only up to 3 players who played in the Philippine Basketball League or Shakey's V-League to keep the competition at a collegiate level.

San Beda College did not field teams in the women's division.

Member schools
In S.Y. 2006-2007, San Sebastian College - Recoletos, FEATI University and Adamson University joined the league.

Far Eastern University
Ateneo de Manila University
De La Salle University-Manila
Adamson University 
University of the East
University of Santo Tomas
Lyceum of the Philippines University
San Sebastian College - Recoletos
De La Salle-College of Saint Benilde
National University (Philippines)
Emilio Aguinaldo College
FEATI University

Champions
Basketball

 The 2006 Slam Dunk Competition was won by Japeth Aguilar of the Ateneo de Manila. The 3-Point Shoot-out was won by Jai Reyes, also from the Ateneo de Manila.

Volleyball

Men's Basketball 2005-2006
 January 21, 2006 - EAC Gym
 Benilde def. Lyceum - 83-74
 San Beda def. Far Eastern - 79-53
 Emilio Aguinaldo def. East - 77-71
 Ateneo def. La Salle - 77-67
 Bye: UST
 January 27, 2006
 Far Eastern def. Benilde - 46-42
 Santo Tomas def. East - 81-74
 January 31, 2006
 La Salle def. Lyceum - 71-64
 February 3, 2006
 Ateneo def. Lyceum - 73-71
 East def. La Salle - 83-51
 Far Eastern def. Emilio Aguinaldo - 82-69
 San Beda def. Santo Tomas - 74-70
 February 9, 2006
 San Beda def. Benilde - 70-57
 Far Eastern def. Lyceum - 91-58
 Emilio Aguinaldo def. Ateneo - 64-57
 February 11, 2006
 East def. San Beda - 89-78
 La Salle def. Emilio Aguinaldo - 74-64
 Far Eastern def. Ateneo - 74-71
 February 14, 2006
 La Salle def. Far Eastern - 74-70
 February 15, 2006
 San Beda def. Emilio Aguinaldo - 77-53
 Far Eastern def. Santo Tomas - 83-69
 Ateneo def. Benilde - 79-61
 February 17, 2006
 East def. Far Eastern - 88-61
 Lyceum def. Santo Tomas - 85-81
 Benilde def. Emilio Aguinaldo - 57-54
 February 20, 2006
 Santo Tomas def. La Salle - 70-62
 February 27, 2006
 Ateneo def. San Beda - 72-70
 March 1, 2006
 San Beda def. Lyceum - 89-79
 Santo Tomas def. Emilio Aguinaldo - 90-74
 Benilde def. La Salle - 70-64
 East def. Ateneo - 80-76
 March 5, 2006
 Ateneo def. Santo Tomas - 97-90
 East def. Benilde - 86-61
 Final Four - March 9, 2006
 San Beda (2) def. Far Eastern (3) - 78-72
 East (1) def. Ateneo (4) - 81-58
 San Beda and East advance to Finals
 Finals - March 11, 2006
 East def. San Beda - 93-76
 East wins second straight title.

Women's Basketball 2005-2006
 Final Four - March 9, 2006
 Santo Tomas (3) def. Ateneo (2) - 81-74
 University of the East (1) def. La Salle (4)- 78-63
 Finals - March 11, 2006
 University of the East def. Santo Tomas - 73-65
 the University of the East dethrones the Ateneo de Manila University as champions

Most Valuable Player is from the University of the East: Lea Lopez

Men's Volleyball 2005-2006

 February 23, 2006
 Emilio Aguinaldo def. La Salle - 22-25, 23-25, 25-18, 25-19, 15-6
 San Beda def. Benilde - 25-22, 19-25, 22-25, 25-20, 15-13
 Ateneo def. East - 25-18, 25-20, 25-23
 Far Eastern def. Santo Tomas - 10-25, 25-14, 25-22, 25-22
 March 2, 2006
 Lyceum def. East - 25-16, 25-6, 25-8
 Benilde def. La Salle - 25-21, 25-11, 25-13
 San Beda def. Santo Tomas - 25-16, 25-15, 25-19
 Far Eastern def. Ateneo - 25-18, 25-22, 20-25, 25-21
 March 8, 2006
 Far Eastern def. Lyceum - 23-25, 25-23, 25-23, 25-21
 San Beda def. La Salle - 25-12, 25-14, 25-15
 Benilde def. Ateneo - 25-22, 28-26, 25-23
 Emilio Aguinaldo def. East - 25-17, 14-25, 25-21, 20-25, 15-12
 Final Four - March 15, 2006
 San Beda (1) def. Santo Tomas (4) - 25-18, 23-25, 25-22, 25-21
 Benilde (3) def. Far Eastern (2) - 25-21, 23-25, 25-21, 18-25, 17-15
 Far Eastern and Benilde advance to Finals
 Finals - March 17, 2006
 Benilde def. San Beda - 25-23, 23-25, 22-25, 25-15, 15-11
 Benilde wins Men's Volleyball title
 Awards
 Rookie of the Year - Labongray of College of Saint Benilde
 Best Attacker - Caganda of Far Eastern University
 Best Setter - Lopez of Far Eastern University
 Best Blocker - Lagar of University of Santo Tomas
 Best Receiver - Santos of San Beda College
 Best Digger - Yee of College of Saint Benilde
 Best Server - Pareja of Ateneo de Manila University
 Most Valuable Player - Espiritu of College of Saint Benilde

Women's Volleyball Event for 2005-2006
{| class="wikitable" style="text-align: center"
|- style="background:#efefef;"
|rowspan=2| Venue ||colspan=6| January 26||rowspan=2| Venue ||colspan=6| January 28
|- style="background:#efefef;"
| Team || 1st || 2nd || 3rd || 4th || 5th || Team || 1st || 2nd || 3rd || 4th || 5th
|-
|rowspan=2| FEU ||  FEU Lady Tamaraws || 25 || 25 || 25 || - || - ||rowspan=2| UE || UE Amazons || 12 || 11 || 6 || - || -
|-
| Benilde Lady Blazers || 19 || 22 || 22 || - || - || La Salle Lady Archers || 25 || 25 || 25 || - || -
|-
|rowspan=2| UE || UE Amazons || 22 || 23 || 19 || - || - ||rowspan=2| UST || UST Tigresses || 25 || 25 || 25 || - || -
|-
| UST Tigresses || 25 || 25 || 25 || - || - || EAC Lady Generals || 8 || 10 || 21 || - || -
|-
|rowspan=2| EAC || EAC Lady Generals || 8 || 6 || 8 || - || - ||rowspan=2| LPU|| Lyceum Lady Pirates || 19 || 25 || 14 || 24 || -
|-
| Lyceum Lady Pirates || 25 || 25 || 25 || - || - || Ateneo Lady Eagles || 25 || 22 || 25 || 26 || -
|-
|rowspan=2| Ateneo || Ateneo Lady Eagles || 23 || 25 || 25 || 26 || - ||rowspan=2| - ||colspan=6| -
|-
| La Salle Lady Archers || 25 || 22 || 14 || 24 || - ||colspan=6| -
|- style="background:#efefef;"
|rowspan=2| Venue ||colspan=6| February 1||rowspan=2| Venue ||colspan=6| February 4
|- style="background:#efefef;"
| Team || 1st || 2nd || 3rd || 4th || 5th || Team || 1st || 2nd || 3rd || 4th || 5th
|-
|rowspan=2| FEU || FEU Lady Tamaraws || 25 || 25 || 25 || - || - ||rowspan=2| EAC || EAC Lady Generals || 6 || 7 || 19 || - || -
|-
| UE Amazons || 20 || 12 || 16 || - || - || FEU Lady Tamaraws || 25 || 25 || 25 || - || -
|-
|rowspan=2| DLSU || La Salle Lady Archers || 25 || 25 || 25 || - || - ||rowspan=2| CSB || Benilde Lady Blazers || 25 || 25 || 25 || - || -
|-
| UST Tigresses || 19 || 13 || 22 || - || - || UE Amazons || 10 || 11 || 22 || - || -
|-
|rowspan=2| CSB || Benilde Lady Blazers ||18 || 25 || 25 || 19 || 12 ||rowspan=2| LPU|| Lyceum Lady Pirates || 28 || 21 || 25 || 25 || -
|-
| Lyceum Lady Pirates || 28 || 22 || 23 || 25 || 15 || UST Tigresses || 26 || 25 || 19 || 21 || -
|- style="background:#efefef;"
|rowspan=2| Venue ||colspan=6| February 9||rowspan=2| Venue ||colspan=6| February 16
|- style="background:#efefef;"
| Team || 1st || 2nd || 3rd || 4th || 5th || Team || 1st || 2nd || 3rd || 4th || 5th
|-
|rowspan=2| Ateneo || Ateneo Lady Eagles || 25 || 25 || 25 || - || - ||rowspan=2| CSB || Benilde Lady Blazers || 25 || 25 || 25 || - || -
|-
| EAC Lady Generals || 8 || 12 || 9 || - || - || EAC Lady Generals || 9 || 7 || 13 || - || -
|-
|rowspan=2| LPU|| Lyceum Lady Pirates || 21 || 27 || 16 || - || - ||rowspan=2| Ateneo || Ateneo Lady Eagles || 25 || 25 || 25 || - || -
|-
| La Salle Lady Archers || 25 || 25 || 25 || - || - || UST Tigresses || 20 || 22 || 22 || - || -
|-
|rowspan=2| UST  || UST Tigresses || 20 || 25|| 21 || 23 || - ||rowspan=2| DLSU || La Salle Lady Archers || 23 || 16 || 23 || - || -
|-
| Benilde Lady Blazers || 25 || 18 || 25 || 25 || - || FEU Lady Tamaraws || 25 || 25 || 25 || - || -
|- style="background:#efefef;"
|rowspan=2| Venue ||colspan=6| February 23 ||rowspan=2| Venue ||colspan=6| March 2
|- style="background:#efefef;"
| Team || 1st || 2nd || 3rd || 4th || 5th || Team || 1st || 2nd || 3rd || 4th || 5th
|-
|rowspan=2| DLSU || La Salle Lady Archers || 25 || 25 || 25 || - || - ||rowspan=2| UE || UE Amazons || 11 || 12 || 19 || - || -
|-
| EAC Lady Generals || 11 || 6 || 10 || - || - || Lyceum Lady Pirates || 25 || 25 || 25 || - || -
|-
|rowspan=2| UE || UE Amazons || 18 || 13 || 14 || - || - ||rowspan=2| DLSU || La Salle Lady Archers || 25 || 25 || 25
|-
| Ateneo Lady Eagles || 25 || 25 || 25 || - || - || Benilde Lady Blazers || 18 || 22 || 23 || - || -
|-
|rowspan=2| UST || UST Tigresses || 20 || 15 || 16 || - || - ||rowspan=2| FEU || FEU Lady Tamaraws || 25 || 28 || 26 || - || -
|-
| FEU Lady Tamaraws || 25 || 25 || 25 || - || - || Ateneo Lady Eagles || 23 || 26 || 24 || - || -
|- style="background:#efefef;"
|rowspan=2| Venue ||colspan=6| March 8 ||rowspan=2| Venue ||colspan=6| March 15 & 17 - Semi-Finals & Finals
|- style="background:#efefef;"
| Team || 1st || 2nd || 3rd || 4th || 5th || Team || 1st || 2nd || 3rd || 4th || 5th''
|-
|rowspan=2| FEU || FEU Lady Tamaraws || 25 || 25 || 25 || - || - ||rowspan=2| LPU|| Lyceum Lady Pirates || 21 || 20 || 15 || - || -
|-
| Lyceum Lady Pirates || 21 || 19 || 17 || - || - || FEU Lady Tamaraws || 25 || 25 || 25 || - || -
|-
|rowspan=2| EAC || EAC Lady Generals || 18 || 12 || 10 || - || - ||rowspan=2| DLSU || La Salle Lady Archers || 25 || 25 || 25 || - || -
|-
| UE Amazons || 25 || 25 || 25 || - || - || Ateneo Lady Eagles || 21 || 20 || 17 || - || -
|-
|rowspan=2| Ateneo || Ateneo Lady Eagles || 25 || 25 || 24 || 20 || 15 ||rowspan=2| DLSU || La Salle Lady Archers || 27 || 26 || 19 || 25 || -
|-
| Benilde Lady Blazers || 18 || 22 || 25 || 25 || 8 || FEU Lady Tamaraws || 25 || 24 || 25 || 16 || -
|}
 La Salle win's Women's Volleyball title
 Awards Rookie of the Year - Stephanie Gabriel of the Ateneo de Manila University
 Best Attacker - Dahlia Cruz of the Lyceum of the Philippines University
 Best Setter - Relea Ferina Saet of De La Salle University-Manila
 Best Scorer - Venus Bernal of the University of Santo Tomas
 Best Blocker - Rachel Anne Daquis of Far Eastern University
 Best Receiver - Sharmaine Miles Peñano of De La Salle University-Manila
 Best Digger - Stephanie Gabriel of the Ateneo de Manila University
 Best Server - Ma. Rosario Soriano of the Ateneo de Manila University
 Most Valuable Player - Mary Anne Manalo of Far Eastern University

Final rankingsSchool Year 2005-2006'''

See also
 National Collegiate Athletic Association (Philippines)
 NCAA Philippines Volleyball Championship
 University Athletic Association of the Philippines
 UAAP Volleyball Champions
 Shakey's V-League

College men's basketball competitions in the Philippines
College men's volleyball in the Philippines
College women's volleyball in the Philippines